Giovanni Carmelo Verga di Fontanabianca (2 September 1840  – 27 January 1922) was an Italian realist (verista) writer, best known for his depictions of life in his native Sicily, especially the short story and later play Cavalleria rusticana and the novel I Malavoglia (The House by the Medlar Tree).

Life and career
The first son of Giovanni Battista Catalano Verga and Caterina Di Mauro, Verga was born into a prosperous family of Catania in Sicily. He began writing in his teens, producing the largely unpublished, but currently quite famous, historical novel Amore e Patria (Love and Homeland); then, although nominally studying law at the University of Catania, he used money his father had given him to publish his I carbonari della montagna (The Carbonari of the Mountain) in 1861 and 1862. This was followed by Sulle lagune (On the Lagoons) in 1863.

Meanwhile, Mr. Verga had been serving in the Catania National Guard (1860–64), after which he travelled to Florence several times, settling there in 1869.

He moved to Milan in 1872, where he developed his new approach, characterized by the use of dialogue to develop character, which resulted in his most significant works. In 1880 his story collection Vita dei campi (Life in the Fields), including "Fantasticheria" ("Daydreaming"), "La lupa" ("The She-wolf"), "Jeli il pastore" ("Jeli the Shepherd"), "Pentolaccia" ("The Plaything"), and Rosso Malpelo, most of which were about rural Sicily, came out. It also included "Cavalleria rusticana" ("Rustic Chivalry"), which he adapted for the theatre - and later formed the basis for several opera librettos, including Mascagni's Cavalleria rusticana and Gastaldon's Mala Pasqua!. Verga's short story, "Malaria", was one of the first literary depictions of the disease malaria.

He then embarked on a projected series of five novels, the Ciclo dei vinti (Cycle of the Vanquished) dealing with the problem of social and economical advancement. However he only completed two, I Malavoglia (1881) and Mastro-don Gesualdo (1889), the second of which was the last major work of his literary career. Both are widely recognized as masterpieces. He then began to write La Duchessa di Leyra, but he only completed the first chapter, while the last two novels, L'Onorevole Scipioni and L'Uomo di Lusso, were not even started.

In 1894 Verga moved back to Catania, to the house in which he had lived as a child.  This house in the city of Catania on via Sant'Anna #8 is now a museum dedicated to the author. The Casa-Museo Giovanni Verga is located on the second floor of a generally unimposing 18th-century palace. The furnishings were those present at the time of his death, including his large personal library. Also in Catania, a performance stage that often performs works of local artists, the Teatro Verga, was founded in 1969 in a former movie theater located on  Via Giuseppe Fava #34.

In 1920 he was appointed  Senator of the Kingdom (Senatore del Regno) for life (ad vitam). He died of a cerebral thrombosis in 1922. He was an atheist. In 2022 the official Verga 100 event was launched, dedicated to the centenary of the writer, with many events from Palermo to Milan, from theater to musical performances, Cinema, and Book Festival

Bibliography

Novels
Love and Homeland (1856–1857) (Amore e patria)
Carbonari of the Mountain (1861–1862) (I carbonari della montagna)
On the Lagoons (1862–1863) (Sulle lagune)
A Sinner (1866) (Una peccatrice)
History of a Blackcap (1871) (Storia di una capinera)
Eva (1873) (Eva)
Eros (1875) (Eros)
Royal Tiger (1875) (Tigre reale)
The House by the Medlar-Tree (1881) (I Malavoglia) 
Elena's Husband (1882) (Il marito di Elena)
Mastro-don Gesualdo (1889) (Mastro-don Gesualdo)
From Yours to Mine (1905) (Dal tuo al mio)

Short stories

Nedda (1874)
The She-Wolf (1874) (La Lupa) 
Spring and other Stories (1877) (Primavera e altri racconti)
Spring (Primavera)
The Tail of the Devil (La coda del diavolo)
X (X)
Certain Subjects (Certi argomenti)
The Stories of the Trezza's Castle (Le storie del castello di Trezza)
Red Evil Hair (1878) (Rosso Malpelo)
The Life of the Fields (1880) (Vita dei campi)
Rustic Chivalry (also translated as Rustic Honour) (Cavalleria rusticana)
Jeli the Shepherd (Jeli il pastore)
Little Novels of Sicily (1883) (Novelle rusticane) translated by D.H. Lawrence (1925)
His Reverence (Il reverendo)
So Much for the King (Cos'è il re)
Don Licciu Papa (Don Licciu papa)
The Mystery Play (Il mistero)
Malaria (Malaria)
The Orphans (Gli orfani)
Property (La roba)
Story of St. Joseph's Ass (Storia dell'asino di S. Giuseppe)
Black Bread (Pane nero)
The Gentry (I galantuomini)
Liberty (Libertà)
Across the Sea (Di là del mare)

References

Further reading
 Gesù Sebastiano L'Etna nel cinema. Un vulcano di celluloide, Giuseppe Maimone Editore, Catania, 2005
 Nunzio Zago, Racconto della letteratura siciliana, Giuseppe Maimone Editore, Catania 2000
 Scritti su Verga, di Luigi Pirandello e Vittorio Emanuele Orlando, prefazione di Giuseppe Giarrizzo,  Giuseppe Maimone Editore, Catania, 1992
 Verga e il cinema. Con una sceneggiatura verghiana inedita di Cavalleria rusticana, testo di Gesualdo Bufalino a cura di Nino Genovese e Sebastiano Gesù, Giuseppe Maimone Editore, Catania, 1996
Piero Garofalo, "Once Upon a Time... Giovanni Verga's Narrative Strategies in 'Jeli il pastore' and 'Rosso Malpelo,'" in 117.1 MLN (2002):  pp. 84–105

External links

 
 
 
  Giovanni Verga: all the works
  I Malavoglia - chapter 1 on audio mp3 for free
  Collected works of Giovanni Verga
 Poor People are Like Oysters: The Life of Giovanni Verga 
 Rosso Malpelo (full text) at The Short Story Project
Musei online, brief entry on Casa Museo Giovanni Verga.

1840 births
1922 deaths
People from Vizzini
Writers from Catania
19th-century Italian male writers
20th-century Italian male writers
Neurological disease deaths in Sicily
Deaths from cerebral thrombosis